Alene may refer to:
Alène, a river in Burgundy, France

Alene Duerk (1920–2018), rear admiral
Alene Holt
Alene Lee (1931–1991), member of Beat Generation
Alene Nikolayev, Bulgarian activist
Alene Paone, CEO of Paone Press
Alene Robertson, American musical theatre actress
Alene S. Ammond (1933–2019), American politician

See also
 Coeur d'Alene (disambiguation)
Allene (given name)